The Veronese Riddle is a riddle written in late Vulgar Latin, or early Romance, on the Verona Orational, probably in the 8th or early 9th century, by a Christian monk from Verona, in northern Italy. It is an example of a writing-riddle, a popular genre in the Middle Ages and still in circulation in recent times. Discovered by Luigi Schiaparelli in 1924, it may be the earliest extant example of Romance writing in Italy.

Text
The text, with a literal translation, runs:

Explanation
The subject of the riddle is the writer himself: the oxen are his fingers which draw a feather (the white plow) across the page (the white field), leaving a trail of ink (the black seed).

Origins of the Indovinello

The Riddle was written on codex LXXXIX (89) of the Biblioteca Capitolare di Verona. The parchment, discovered by Schiapparelli in 1924, is a Mozarabic oration by the Spanish Christian Church, probably written in Toledo. From there it was brought to Cagliari and then to Pisa before reaching the Chapter of Verona.

Text analysis and comments
Though initially hailed as the earliest document in an Italian vernacular in the first years following Schiapparelli's discovery, today the record has been disputed by many scholars from Bruno Migliorini to Cesare Segre and Francesco Bruni, who have placed it at the latest stage of Vulgar Latin, though this very term is far from being clear-cut, and Migliorini himself considers it dilapidated. At present, however, the Placito Capuano (960 AD; the first in a series of four documents dated 960-963 AD issued by a Capuan court) is considered to be the oldest undisputed example of Romance writing in Italy.

Some words do adhere to the rules of Latin grammar (boves with -es for the accusative masculine plural, alba with -a suffix for the neuter plural). Yet more are distinctly vernacular, with no cases and producing the typical ending of Romance verbs: pareba (It. pareva), araba (It. arava), teneba (It. teneva), seminaba (It. seminava) instead of Latin imperfect tense parebat, arabat, tenebat, seminabat. Albo versorio and negro semen have been written for the Latin album versorium and nigrum semen. Versorio is still the word for "plough" in today's Veronese dialect (and other varieties of the Venetian language), just as the verb parar is still the word for 'push on', 'drive', 'lead' (Italian, by contrast, has spingere, guidare). Michele A. Cortelazzo and Ivano Paccagnella say that the plural -es of boves may well be considered Ladin and therefore a genuine Romance plural rather than a latinism. Albo 'white' is found in Old Italian, in competition with the Germanic bianco which eventually ousted it from its place in everyday speech.

See also
Placiti Cassinesi
Commodilla catacomb inscription
Saint Clement and Sisinnius Inscription

References

Notes

 Bruno Migliorini, Storia della lingua italiana. Firenze, Sansoni, 1987.
 Aldo Giudice, Giovanni Bruni, Problemi e scrittori della lingua italiana. Torino, Paravia 1973, vols.
 AA.VV. Il libro Garzanti della lingua italiana. Milano, Garzanti, 1969.
 Lucia Cesarini Martinelli, La filologia. Roma, Editori Riuniti, 1984.

External links
 Indovinello Veronese

Earliest known manuscripts by language
Riddles
Italian language
10th-century poems
Culture in Verona
History of Verona
Italian manuscripts
10th-century manuscripts
Works about writing